The Rhine-Alpine Corridor is one of the ten priority corridors of the Trans-European Transport Network. It is a rail and roadway network.

It connects a total of five countries over 1,300 kilometers and connects Genoa in Italy with Rotterdam in the Netherlands.

Route 
The corridor is divided into six sections:

 Genoa – Milan – Zurich – Basel
 Milan - Novara - Berne - Basel
 Basel - Strasbourg - Mannheim - Frankfurt - Cologne
 Cologne – Dusseldorf – Utrecht – Amsterdam
 Cologne - Liège - Brussels - Ghent - Bruges
 Liège - Antwerp - Rotterdam

References

External links 

 Official Website

TEN-T Core Network Corridors